Bipasha Elizabeth Ling, known professionally as Bip Ling (stylised as BIP LING) is an English model, influencer, musician, fashion illustrator, and visual artist. She has modeled in various publications, including British Vogue, Vogue, NYLON, and LOVE, and has worked as a presenter for Vogue.com. Ling has modeled for fashion brands such as Forever 21, Nike, and Calvin Klein, and has produced fashion illustrations for Topshop. She is known for her blog, Bipling.com, and her mascot, Mooch, a cartoon bear.

Life and career 
Ling's mother, Tanya Ling, is a fashion illustrator. Her father, William Ling, owns the Fashion Illustration Gallery.

Ling studied Fine Art at Central Saint Martins. She launched her own fashion blog, bipashaelizabethling.blogspot.com, in 2009. She was signed to modelling agency Storm Management at age 21.

Ling first started DJing at age 17. She released her first single, "Bipping", in 2014, followed by two more, "Bip Burger" (2015), and "Curry" (2017). She released her first album, Church of Bop, in 2018.

Discography

Albums
Church of Bop (Self-released, November 24, 2018)
Bip UP The NHS, Yar! (Self-released, May 25, 2020)
Jokez (Self-released, September 8, 2020)

EPs
"Baby Bop" (Self-released, July 7, 2020)

Songs
"Bipping" (Self-released, December 28, 2014)
"Bip Burger" (Self-released, October 29, 2015) - (Church of Bop)
"Pizza Slice" (Self-released, May 10, 2017) - (Church of Bop)
"Curry" (Self-released, May 15, 2017) - (Church of Bop)
"STRIP" (Self-released, May 16, 2017)
"Buff Girlz" (Self-released, May 24, 2017)
"Sex Party" (Self-released, May 25, 2017)
"Bip Billionaire" (Self-released, July 23, 2017)
"Skinny Bippin" (Self-released, September 12, 2017)
"Boy Accessory" (Self-released, January 1, 2018)
"Galloping" (Self-released, April 12, 2018) - (Church of Bop)
"Ocean Queen" (Self-released, May 15, 2018) - (Church of Bop)
"Starters (Intro)" (Self-released, May 16, 2018) - (Church of Bop)
"Bopcorn" (Self-released, December 13, 2018) - (Church of Bop)
"Donna Trope" (Self-released, December 13, 2018) - (Church of Bop)
"Pout!" (Self-released, February 25, 2019)
"B.F.D." (Self-released, June 26, 2019)
"Black Pudding" (Self-released, October 24, 2019)
"Apple Juice Drink" (Self-released, February 27, 2020) - (Jokez)
"BIPTCH!!!" (Self-released, March 2, 2020)
"Way Too Mooch!!!" (Self-released, March 5, 2020)
"Coronavirus!!!" (Self-released, March 15, 2020)
"DAHL-LING" (Self-released, March 16, 2020)
"ONLY THE BODY CAN KILL THE VIRUS!!!" (Self-released, March 18, 2020)
"NUMBERZ" (Self-released, March 29, 2020)
"Let's Learn To Wash Our Hands! (Hand Wash!!!)" (Self-released, March 31, 2020) - (Baby Bop)
"CUDDLEZ" (Self-released, April 1, 2020) - (Baby Bop)
"TOILET ROLL" (Self-released, April 6, 2020)
"SHALOM" (Self-released, April 7, 2020)
"COLOURS" (Self-released, April 8, 2020) - (Baby Bop)
"BALLET" (Self-released, April 15, 2020)
"George Orwell 1984 Bip Book Review Bop" (Self-released, April 18, 2020)
"PAPER DOLL" (Self-released, April 21, 2020)
"COLLECTING ART" (Self-released, April 22, 2020)
"PLAY PAUSE STOP" (Self-released, April 23, 2020) - (Baby Bop)
"PPE PEOPLE" (Self-released, April 30, 2020)
"SERIOUS MATERIAL" (Self-released, May 2, 2020)
"BOP MOP" (Self-released, May 3, 2020)
"Hoover" (Self-released, May 25, 2020) - (Bip UP The NHS, Yar!)
"Rubber Gloves" (Self-released, May 25, 2020) - (Bip UP The NHS, Yar!)
"Mask" (Self-released, May 25, 2020) - (Bip UP The NHS, Yar!)
"Goggles" (Self-released, May 25, 2020) - (Bip UP The NHS, Yar!)
"Sponge" (Self-released, May 25, 2020) - (Bip UP The NHS, Yar!)
"Needles" (Self-released, May 25, 2020) - (Bip UP The NHS, Yar!)
"Exxal 10 + 13" (Self-released, May 25, 2020) - (Bip UP The NHS, Yar!)
"Syringe" (Self-released, May 25, 2020) - (Bip UP The NHS, Yar!)
"Paraphernalia" (Self-released, September 8, 2020) - (Jokez)
"Bright Edges" (Self-released, September 8, 2020) - (Jokez)
"Flip Flop" (Self-released, September 8, 2020) - (Jokez)
"Opal" (Self-released, September 8, 2020) - (Jokez)
"Shellfish" (Self-released, September 8, 2020) - (Jokez)
"Jokes" (Self-released, September 8, 2020) - (Jokez)
"Cloud Museum" (Self-released, September 8, 2020) - (Jokez)

References

External links

Living people
Musicians from London
English electronic musicians
English female models
1989 births